Gardner Payne "Bud" Hurley (born June 28, 1932) is a Canadian politician. He represented the electoral district of Cumberland West in the Nova Scotia House of Assembly from 1984 to 1988. He was a member of the Progressive Conservative Party of Nova Scotia.

A resident of Maccan, Nova Scotia, Hurley served as Warden of Cumberland County in the early 1980s. He entered provincial politics in the 1984 election, winning the Cumberland West riding by 658 votes. In the 1988 election, he was defeated by Liberal Ross Bragg by 83 votes.

References

Living people
Progressive Conservative Association of Nova Scotia MLAs
People from Cumberland County, Nova Scotia
1932 births
Nova Scotia municipal councillors